Triathlon competitions at the 2019 Pan American Games in Lima, Peru are scheduled to be held between July 27 and 29, 2019 at Chorrillos Beach.

In 2016, the International Olympic Committee made several changes to its sports program, which were subsequently implemented for these games. Included in this was the addition of the triathlon mixed relay event.

Medal table

Medalists

Qualification

A total of 70 triathletes (35 per gender) will qualify to compete. A nation may enter a maximum of 6 triathletes (three per gender). The host nation (Peru) automatically qualified four athletes (two per gender). All other nations qualified through various qualifying tournaments and rankings. A further three invitational slots, per gender, were also awarded. A maximum five nations could enter the maximum of 6 triathletes.

See also
Triathlon at the 2020 Summer Olympics

References

External links
 Results book

 
Events at the 2019 Pan American Games
Pan American Games
2019